Discourse analysis (DA), or discourse studies, is an approach to the analysis of written, vocal, or sign language use, or any significant semiotic event.

The objects of discourse analysis (discourse, writing, conversation, communicative event) are variously defined in terms of coherent sequences of sentences, propositions, speech, or turns-at-talk. Contrary to much of traditional linguistics, discourse analysts not only study language use 'beyond the sentence boundary' but also prefer to analyze 'naturally occurring' language use, not invented examples. Text linguistics is a closely related field. The essential difference between discourse analysis and text linguistics is that discourse analysis aims at revealing socio-psychological characteristics of a person/persons rather than text structure.

Discourse analysis has been taken up in a variety of disciplines in the humanities and social sciences, including linguistics, education, sociology, anthropology, social work, cognitive psychology, social psychology, area studies, cultural studies, international relations, human geography,  environmental science, communication studies, biblical studies, public relations, argumentation studies, and translation studies, each of which is subject to its own assumptions, dimensions of analysis, and methodologies.

History

Early use of the term

The ancient Greeks (among others) had much to say on discourse; however, there is ongoing discussion about whether Austria-born Leo Spitzer's Stilstudien (Style Studies) of 1928 is the earliest example of discourse analysis (DA). Michel Foucault translated it into French. However, the term first came into general use following the publication of a series of papers by Zellig Harris from 1952 reporting on work from which he developed transformational grammar in the late 1930s. Formal equivalence relations among the sentences of a coherent discourse are made explicit by using sentence transformations to put the text in a canonical form. Words and sentences with equivalent information then appear in the same column of an array.

This work progressed over the next four decades (see references) into a science of sublanguage analysis (Kittredge & Lehrberger 1982), culminating in a demonstration of the informational structures in texts of a sublanguage of science, that of Immunology, (Harris et al. 1989) and a fully articulated theory of linguistic informational content (Harris 1991). During this time, however, most linguists ignored such developments in favor of a succession of elaborate theories of sentence-level syntax and semantics.

In January 1953, a linguist working for the American Bible Society, James A. Lauriault/Loriot, needed to find answers to some fundamental errors in translating Quechua, in the Cuzco area of Peru. Following Harris's 1952 publications, he worked over the meaning and placement of each word in a collection of Quechua legends with a native speaker of Quechua and was able to formulate discourse rules that transcended the simple sentence structure. He then applied the process to Shipibo, another language of Eastern Peru. He taught the theory at the  Summer Institute of Linguistics in Norman, Oklahoma, in the summers of 1956 and 1957 and entered the  University of Pennsylvania to study with Harris in the interim year. He tried to publish a paper Shipibo Paragraph Structure, but it was delayed until 1970 (Loriot & Hollenbach 1970). In the meantime, Kenneth Lee Pike, a professor at University of Michigan, Ann Arbor, taught the theory, and one of his students, Robert E. Longacre developed it in his writings. Harris's methodology disclosing the correlation of form with meaning was developed into a system for the computer-aided analysis of natural language by a team led by Naomi Sager at NYU, which has been applied to a number of sublanguage domains, most notably to medical informatics. The software for the Medical Language Processor is publicly available on SourceForge.

In the humanities
In the late 1960s and 1970s, and without reference to this prior work, a variety of other approaches to a new cross-discipline of DA began to develop in most of the humanities and social sciences concurrently with, and related to, other disciplines. These include semiotics, psycholinguistics, sociolinguistics, and pragmatics. Many of these approaches, especially those influenced by the social sciences, favor a more dynamic study of oral talk-in-interaction. An example is  "conversational analysis", which was influenced by the Sociologist Harold Garfinkel, the founder of Ethnomethodology.

Foucault
In Europe, Michel Foucault became one of the key theorists of the subject, especially of discourse, and wrote The Archaeology of Knowledge. In this context, the term 'discourse' no longer refers to formal linguistic aspects, but to institutionalized patterns of knowledge that become manifest in disciplinary structures and operate by the connection of knowledge and power. Since the 1970s, Foucault's works have had an increasing impact especially on discourse analysis in the field of social sciences. Thus, in modern European social sciences, one can find a wide range of different approaches working with Foucault's definition of discourse and his theoretical concepts. Apart from the original context in France, there is, since 2005, a broad discussion on socio-scientific discourse analysis in Germany. Here, for example, the sociologist Reiner Keller developed his widely recognized 'Sociology of Knowledge Approach to Discourse (SKAD)'. Following the sociology of knowledge by Peter L. Berger and Thomas Luckmann, Keller argues that our sense of reality in everyday life and thus the meaning of every object, action and event is the product of a permanent, routinized interaction. In this context, SKAD has been developed as a scientific perspective that is able to understand the processes of 'The Social Construction of Reality' on all levels of social life by combining the prementioned Michel Foucault's theories of discourse and power while also introducing the theory of knowledge by Berger/Luckmann. Whereas the latter primarily focus on the constitution and stabilization of knowledge on the level of interaction, Foucault's perspective concentrates on institutional contexts of the production and integration of knowledge, where the subject mainly appears to be determined by knowledge and power. Therefore, the 'Sociology of Knowledge Approach to Discourse' can also be seen as an approach to deal with the vividly discussed micro–macro problem in sociology.

Perspectives
The following are some of the specific theoretical perspectives and analytical approaches used in linguistic discourse analysis:

Applied linguistics, an interdisciplinary perspective on linguistic analysis
 Cognitive neuroscience of discourse comprehension
Cognitive psychology, studying the production and comprehension of discourse.
Conversation analysis
Critical discourse analysis
Discursive psychology
Emergent grammar
Ethnography of communication
Functional grammar
Interactional sociolinguistics
Mediated Stylistics
Pragmatics
Response based therapy (counselling)
Rhetoric
Stylistics (linguistics)
Sublanguage analysis
Tagmemics
Text linguistics
Variation analysis

Although these approaches emphasize different aspects of language use, they all view language as social interaction and are concerned with the social contexts in which discourse is embedded.

Often a distinction is made between 'local' structures of discourse (such as relations among sentences, propositions, and turns) and 'global' structures, such as overall topics and the schematic organization of discourses and conversations. For instance, many types of discourse begin with some kind of global 'summary', in titles, headlines, leads, abstracts, and so on.

A problem for the discourse analyst is to decide when a particular feature is relevant to the specification required. A question many linguists ask is: "Are there general principles which will determine the relevance or nature of the specification?"

Topics of interest
Topics of discourse analysis include:
 The various levels or dimensions of discourse, such as sounds (intonation, etc.), gestures, syntax, the lexicon, style, rhetoric, meanings, speech acts, moves, strategies, turns, and other aspects of interaction
Genres of discourse (various types of discourse in politics, the media, education, science, business, etc.)
The relations between discourse and the emergence of syntactic structure
The relations between text (discourse) and context
The relations between discourse and power
The relations between discourse and interaction
The relations between discourse and cognition and memory
Lexical density

Prominent academics 
 Jan Blommaert 
 Teun van Dijk
 Norman Fairclough
 Michel Foucault
 Heidi E. Hamilton
 Barbara Johnstone 
 Sinfree Makoni
 Jonathan Potter
 Deborah Schiffrin
 Deborah Tannen
 Margaret Wetherell
 Ruth Wodak

Political discourse

Political discourse is the text and talk of professional politicians or political institutions, such as presidents and prime ministers and other members of government, parliament or political parties, both at the local, national and international levels, includes both the speaker and the audience.

Political discourse analysis is a field of discourse analysis which focuses on discourse in political forums (such as debates, speeches, and hearings) as the phenomenon of interest. Policy analysis requires discourse analysis to be effective from the post-positivist perspective.

Political discourse is the formal exchange of reasoned views as to which of several alternative courses of action should be taken to solve a societal problem.

Corporate discourse 
Corporate discourse can be broadly defined as the language used by corporations. It encompasses a set of messages that a corporation sends out to the world  (the general public, the customers and other corporations) and the messages it uses to communicate within its own structures (the employees and other stakeholders).

See also

Actor (policy debate)
Critical discourse analysis
Dialogical analysis
Discourse representation theory
Frame analysis
Communicative action
Essex School of discourse analysis
Ethnolinguistics
Foucauldian discourse analysis
Interpersonal communication
Linguistic anthropology
Narrative analysis
Pragmatics
Rhetoric
Sociolinguistics
Statement analysis
Stylistics (linguistics)
Worldview

References

External links

 DiscourseNet. International Association for Discourse Studies
 The Discourse Attributes Analysis Program and Measures of the Referential Process.
 Linguistic Society of America: Discourse Analysis, by Deborah Tannen
 Discourse Analysis by Z. Harris
 Daniel L. Everett, Documenting Languages: The View from the Brazilian Amazon Statement concerning James Loriot, p. 9
 A discourse analysis related international conference You can find some information and events related to Metadiscourse Across Genres by visiting MAG 2017 website

 
Systemic functional linguistics
Applied linguistics
Sociolinguistics
Translation studies
Postmodernism
Postmodern theory